Mario Kovačević (born 17 May 1975) is a Croatian football coach and former player.

Club career
Kovačević has been a central midfielder for Dinamo Tirana since January 2008. He has also played for the following teams: NK Međimurje, NK Slaven Belupo, FK Budućnost Podgorica, NK Belišće, and NK Varteks.

References

External links

1975 births
Living people
People from Jablanica, Bosnia and Herzegovina
Association football midfielders
Croatian footballers
NK Varaždin players
NK Belišće players
NK Slaven Belupo players
NK Međimurje players
NK Nafta Lendava players
FK Dinamo Tirana players
Croatian Football League players
Slovenian PrvaLiga players
Croatian expatriate footballers
Expatriate footballers in Slovenia
Croatian expatriate sportspeople in Slovenia
Expatriate footballers in Albania
Croatian expatriate sportspeople in Albania
Croatian football managers
NK Međimurje managers